David Allen Bayer (born November 29, 1955) is an American mathematician known for his contributions in algebra and symbolic computation and for his consulting work in the movie industry. He is a professor of mathematics at Barnard College, Columbia University.

Education and career
Bayer was educated at Swarthmore College as an undergraduate, where he attended a course on combinatorial algorithms given by Herbert Wilf. During that semester, Bayer related several original ideas to Wilf on the subject. These contributions were later incorporated into the second edition of Wilf and Albert Nijenhuis' influential book Combinatorial Algorithms, with a detailed acknowledgement by its authors. Bayer subsequently earned his Ph.D. at Harvard University in 1982 under the direction of Heisuke Hironaka with a dissertation entitled The Division Algorithm and the Hilbert Scheme. He joined Columbia University thereafter.

Bayer is the son of Bryce Bayer, the inventor of the Bayer filter.

Contributions
Bayer has worked in various areas of algebra and symbolic computation, including Hilbert functions, Betti numbers, and linear programming. He has written a number of highly cited papers in these areas with other notable mathematicians, including Bernd Sturmfels, Jeffrey Lagarias, Persi Diaconis, Irena Peeva, and David Eisenbud. Bayer is one of ten individuals cited in the white paper published by the pseudonymous Satoshi Nakamoto describing the technological underpinnings of Bitcoin. He is cited as a co-author, along with Stuart Haber and W. Scott Stornetta, of a paper to improve on a system for tamper-proofing timestamps by incorporating Merkle trees.

Consulting
Bayer was a mathematics consultant for the film A Beautiful Mind, the biopic of John Nash, and also had a cameo as one of the "Pen Ceremony" professors.

References

External links
Bayer's homepage at Columbia University

 
Dave and Beautiful Math at Swarthmore College Bulletin

Living people
1955 births
Mathematicians from New York (state)
20th-century American mathematicians
21st-century American mathematicians
Swarthmore College alumni
Harvard University alumni
Barnard College faculty
Algebraists
Combinatorialists
Algebraic geometers
Scientists from Rochester, New York